Miramar is a small seaside village near the towns of Gulpilhares and Arcozelo, in the municipality of Vila Nova de Gaia, in the subregion of Greater Porto, Portugal (Grande Porto).

About 
It is an upmarket residential area south of the river Douro, most known for its beach – Praia de Miramar (Miramar Beach) – and the small chapel called Senhor da Pedra (Lord of the Rock), which forms the central attraction of a yearly festival. This chapel is also featured in the film clip "San Simon", directed by Richard Tomes with music by the Pikoul Sisters. Indeed, Miramar is home to a number of artists and intellectuals, including Marina Pikoul and David Wyn Lloyd among others. There are many large houses and mansions in Miramar, as well as in the nearby Praia da Aguda and Praia da Granja. Along the beach, there are several cafés ("esplanadas"). Despite its pleasant location, Miramar is not an international tourist destination. However, during the warm summer months, many Portuguese from the surrounding areas of Porto, Gaia and Espinho spend their days at the beach of Miramar, and also at neighbouring beaches of the Costa Verde.

Sports
Along the beach of Miramar, there is a small 9-hole golf course called Clube de Golf de Miramar.

There is also a private sports club called Sport Clube Alberto de Sousa, best known for its tennis courts.

Restaurants and Cafés
The biggest café/restaurant along the beach of Miramar is the "Areal", which has a café and kiosk facing away from the sea and a restaurant with a view of the beach.

Train
Miramar (short walk to the village and the beach); suburban trains to Valadares, Vila Nova de Gaia, Porto to the North and Granja, Espinho, Esmoriz, Ovar, Estarreja and Aveiro to the South.

See also 

 Tourism in Vila Nova de Gaia

References 

Populated coastal places in Portugal
Villages in Portugal